Bryan Charles (born 19 June 1995) is a West Indian cricketer. He was part of the West Indies' squad for the 2014 ICC Under-19 Cricket World Cup. He made his List A debut for West Indies B in the 2018–19 Regional Super50 tournament on 3 October 2018.

In June 2020, he was selected by Trinidad and Tobago, in the players' draft hosted by Cricket West Indies ahead of the 2020–21 domestic season.

References

External links
 

1995 births
Living people
Trinidad and Tobago cricketers
West Indies B cricketers